Izbushensky is a rural locality (a khutor) in Ust-Khopyorskoye Rural Settlement, Serafimovichsky District, Volgograd Oblast, Russia. The population was 14 as of 2010. 

During World War 2 it was the sight of the famous Charge of the Savoia Cavalleria at Izbushensky, when an Italian cavalry division charged on horseback against their Soviet enemies.

Geography 
Izbushensky is located 42 km southwest of Serafimovich (the district's administrative centre) by road. Rybny is the nearest rural locality.

References 

Rural localities in Serafimovichsky District